The Yakut Autonomous Soviet Socialist Republic (Yakutskaya Avtonomnaya Sovetskaya Sotsialisticheskaya Respublika; , Saxa avtonomnay sebieskey sotsialistiçyeskey ryespublikata), Soviet Yakutia, or the Yakut ASSR (Yakutskaya ASSR), was an autonomous republic of the Russian SFSR within the Soviet Union.

History
It was created on April 27 1922, during the Yakut revolt, and was transformed into the Sakha Republic in 1991.

See also
First Secretary of the Yakut Communist Party

Notes

References 

Autonomous republics of the Russian Soviet Federative Socialist Republic
States and territories established in 1922
States and territories disestablished in 1991
Former socialist republics
1922 establishments in Russia
1991 disestablishments in the Soviet Union
History of the Sakha Republic